Shakambhari Purnima is a Hindu festival primarily observed in India, celebrating the goddess Shakambhari. It is observed in Paush month, which normally comes in January. Shakambari Purnima is the last day in the 8-day long holiday of Shakambari Navratri. "Most Navratri begins on Shukla Pratipada except for Shakambari Navratri, which begins on Ashtami and ends on Purnima in Paush month.".

Bathing is an important ritual during Purnima holidays. Devotees can regularly be seen bathing in rivers from the morning and throughout the day . Devotees pour water on themselves while facing the sun as they carry on with other religious practices. Shaktipeeth Shakambhari Devi Temple is a superpower located in Saharanpur district of Uttar Pradesh. This region is the proven place of Bhagwati Shatakshi. This extremely rare pilgrimage area is called Panchkosi Siddhpeeth. The head of Bhagwati Sati fell in this area, so it is counted in the famous Shakti Peethas of the Goddess. The famous journey of the nine goddesses of North India is not complete without a visit to Goddess Shakambhari Devi. Situated on the Shivalik Mountains, it is the oldest pilgrimage of Shakambhari Devi.People in Hinduism celebrate this day as Shakambhari Jayanti. Mata Shakambhari Devi came to earth for public welfare. This is the nature of mother nature. Mother Shakambari was revealed amidst the dense forests in the foothills of the Shivalik ranges of the Himalayas. With the grace of Mother Shakambhari, the starving creatures and the dried up earth got new life. Mother has many temples across the country, but the glory of Saharanpur Shaktipeeth is unique because it is the oldest Shaktipeeth of Mother. The main Shaktipeeth is in addition to this, one of the main temples of Mata sits in a beautiful valley in the hills of Aravalli in Sikar district of Rajasthan, which is known as Sakrai Mata Another temple of Mata as the Kuldevi of Chauhans, Mata Shakambhari Devi sits inside the salt lake in Sambhar. Mother Nadambari is worshiped in the name of Ashapura Devi in Nadol, Rajasthan. This mother is known as Banashankari in South India. Kanakadurga is one of their forms. The festival of Shakambhari Navratri and Pausha Purnima are celebrated in all these places. The temples have a conch sound and the sanctum sanctorum is decorated with herb vegetables and fruits.

References
Shakambari Purnima 
Shakambhari
Shakambari Purnima 
Significance of Shakambari Purnima
Dhyansanjivani

External links

Hindu festivals
Religious festivals in India
Hindi words and phrases
Observances held on the full moon